TU6 (ТУ6) is a Soviet narrow gauge diesel locomotive for the track gauge of .

History
The first TU6A was built in 1973 at the Kambarka Engineering Works. 3,915 TU6A locomotives were produced until 1988. The locomotives were used on many narrow gauge railways to move cargo as well as passenger trains. The cab is equipped with efficient heat-system, radio-set and air conditioning.

Series locomotives
The diesel locomotive TU6A (ТУ6А) has been used as the basis of three other locomotives:
 TU6P (ТУ6П)
 TU6D (ТУ6Д)
 TU6SPA (ТУ6СПА) mobile power station

See also
Kambarka Engineering Works
Narrow gauge railways

References

External links

 Official website Kambarka Engineering Works (Russian language)
 TU6A diesel locomotive (Russian language)
 Series locomotives (Russian language)

750 mm gauge locomotives
Diesel locomotives of the Soviet Union
Diesel locomotives of Russia
Diesel locomotives of Estonia
Diesel locomotives of Ukraine
3 ft 6 in gauge locomotives
Diesel locomotives of Lithuania
Diesel locomotives of Belarus